Gholam Hossein Amirkhani (استاد غلامحسین امیرخانی) is a Persian calligrapher, born in 1939 in Taleghan, Iran. He is the chief of Iran calligraphers council, which established in 1950. He became a member of the Iran Calligraphers Association in 1965 and was named as the master of Iranian calligraphy in 1979. In 2014, he held his first solo exhibition in 15 years, showing his latest works in Tehran's Sareban Gallery.

In 2017 he was awarded Legion of Honor.

References

Iranian calligraphers
Living people
1939 births
People from Alborz Province
Recipients of the Order of Culture and Art
Iranian Science and Culture Hall of Fame recipients in Visual Arts
Recipients of the Legion of Honour